The long sunskink or elongate sunskink (Lampropholis elongata) is a species of skink, a lizard in the family Scincidae. The species is endemic to eastern Australia.

References

Skinks of Australia
Endemic fauna of Australia
Reptiles described in 1997
Lampropholis
Taxa named by Allen Eddy Greer